The final 20 player roster listings were published on 2 March 2016.

Canada

Costa Rica

Grenada

Guatemala

Haiti

Jamaica

Mexico

United States

References

CONCACAF Women's U-17 Championship
2016 in youth association football